Huangchuan County (local pronunciation: Huāngchuǎn Xiàn) is a county of southeastern Henan province, People's Republic of China. It is located in the center of Xinyang City, straddling the Huang River.

The 13th five-year plan of Xinyang City proposes to support the withdrawal of Huangchuan County to apply for the construction of Guangzhou City, build a sub central city in the city area, and accelerate the integrated development of Huangchuan and Guangshan.

History

Origin and early development
According to the ancient Chinese text Bamboo Annals, Huangchuan was the national capital of the first Kingdom of Huang in the Xia dynasty during the 21st century BCE. Later, in the beginning of the Zhou dynasty, a second and separate Kingdom of Huang was founded by King Huang Huilian, and he re-established his national capital in Huangchuan like his early predecessor in the Xia dynasty. His name Huang is considered to be the root origin of the royal ancient Chinese surname Huang (or Hwang). The Kingdom of Huang was later invaded and annexed by the Kingdom of Chu and became a vassal state under the Zhou dynasty in 648 BCE, during the Spring and Autumn period.

Remains of the capital of the Kingdom of Huang were discovered in Longgu, a township six kilometers northwest to the urban area of Huangchuan.

Empire period
After the Qin dynasty. Huangchuan was generally established as a zhou, a commandery or a county.

According to Brief Sketch of North Parts of Ming Dynasty, a book by Ji Liuqi recording the transitional period from the Ming dynasty to the Qing dynasty, Huangchuan (then Guangzhou) was devastated and the residents massacred by the peasant army. And now residents in Huangchuan are mainly descendants of migrants from Jiangxi, Fujian and Guangdong settled down during the Kangxi era in the Qing dynasty.

Republic period
In 1913, Huangchuan was renamed to its current name.

In 2009, Huang-Guang Integration project was launched aiming to integrate Huangchuan County and neighboring Guangshan County.

Former names
 , the surname Huang (黃) is derived from this state

Geography
Huangchuan borders the Huai River in the north, which is regarded as part of the geographical dividing line between North China and South China.

Huang River, a tributary of Huai River, is pronounced the same as Yellow River yet with different characters. Local residents usually call it Little Huang River.

Climate

Administrative divisions
Huangchuan County currently has 4 subdistricts, 9 towns and 8 townships. The county was reorganized in 2005, when the townships of Xiaoludian and Pengjiadian, and the town  of Niugang were assimilated into neighboring towns and townships.

Subdistricts (街道)

Towns (镇)

Townships (乡)

Transport
China National Highway 106 (G106)
China National Highway 312 (G312)
G40 Shanghai–Xi'an Expressway
G45 Daqing–Guangzhou Expressway
Huangchuan railway station

References

County-level divisions of Henan
Xinyang